Castle Semple Collegiate Church is located in Renfrewshire, Scotland. The late Gothic church is under the protection of Historic Environment Scotland as a Scheduled monument.

History
John Sempill, 1st Lord Sempill founded the collegiate church near Castle Semple, in circa 1504. It had a provost, six chaplains or prebendaries, two boys, and a sacristan. James IV of Scotland visited John's house at Eliotston and the collegiate church on 26 July 1505. The king gave an offering of 14 shillings in the "New College." A stone in the outer wall bears the letters R. L. S., and the arms of Sempill and Montgomerie. 
Its walls are covered with ivy. The roof was removed in the 1800s, and the ivy has penetrated into the interior. In ancient times, there appears to have been a village at this place, and a chapel in its neighbourhood dedicated to St. Bride.

Design and architecture

The building is a simple oblong, terminating toward the east in a three-sided apse, and having a square tower projecting from the centre of the west wall. The forms of the double windows indicate that they are very late survivals of Gothic architecture. The other windows in the side walls are altered, but they do not present any features like those of the apse. Over the door to the chancel are two coats of arms with the letters R. L. S. and A. M. S., one shield bearing the Sempill arms and the other those of Montgomerie. The square tower at the west end is extremely simple. The tower and most of the side walls are of about the date of the original foundation, while the east apse has been added in the 16th century, to receive the monument of John, Lord Sempill, who died at the Battle of Flodden in 1513. A few remains of the original squareheaded windows in the side walls are still traceable. The interior was  divided by two solid walls into three compartments, so as to form separate private burial places. In the eastern compartment, there is a large monument to Lord Sempill. A monumental slab in the central compartment  is erected in memory of Gabriel Sempel, who died in 1587.

References
 This article includes text incorporated from A. Fullarton's "The Topographical, statistical, and historical gazetteer of Scotland: with a complete county-atlas from recent surveys, exhibiting all the lines of road, rail, and canal communication; and an appendix, containing the results of the census of 1851" (1853), a publication now in the public domain.
 This article includes text incorporated from D. MacGibbon's "The ecclesiastical architecture of Scotland from the earliest Christian times to the seventeenth century" (1897), a publication now in the public domain.

External links
 Page at RCAHMS
Historic Environment Scotland: Castle Semple Collegiate Church
Castle Semple Collegiate Church, Village & St Bride's Chapel

Religious buildings and structures completed in 1504
Churches in Renfrewshire
Scheduled Ancient Monuments in Renfrewshire
Collegiate churches in Scotland